MLVWM or Macintosh-Like Virtual Window Manager, is an FVWM descendant created by Takashi Hasegawa in 1997 while studying at Nagoya University and was written entirely in the C programming language. As its name implies, it attempts to emulate the pre-Mac OS X Macintosh look and feel in its layout and window design.

Although no longer under active development, MLVWM has spawned a derivative known as HaZe, a Black-and-White (or Monochrome) window manager.

MLVWM is now distributed under the GNU General Public License.

See also 
Graphical User Interface

External links 
Official Webpage
Linuxplanet Review
Mac & PC, and Data recovery
Tucows (Preview) Page

Free X window managers